The International Centre for the Study of Radicalisation and Political Violence (ICSR) is a non-profit, non-governmental think tank based in the Department of War Studies at King’s College London whose mission is to educate the public and help policymakers and practitioners find solutions to radicalisation and political violence. It obtains some of its funding through the European Union.

The organisation is a partnership of five academic institutions: King's College London, the University of Pennsylvania, the Interdisciplinary Center Herzliya (Israel), the Jordan Institute of Diplomacy, and Georgetown University.

Launch and role
ICSR was launched in January 2008 at the First International Conference on Radicalisation and Political Violence in London. During this conference, UK Home Secretary Jacqui Smith launched the government's new anti-terror initiative.

ICSR conducts independent research and describes its mission as follows:

In addition to undertaking its research, ICSR hosts speakers from around the world. In the past these have included US Senator Chuck Hagel, Vice-President of Colombia Francisco Santos Calderon, former President of Ireland Mary Robinson, Secretary-General of the Council of Europe Terry Davis as well as several prominent terrorism experts and commentators featured as panelists including BBC's Frank Gardner, Olivier Roy, Peter Bergen of the New America Foundation, Richard Dearlove (former head of MI6) and Daniel Benjamin of the Brookings Institution.

Research

In August 2017, ICSR published a report on the impact of Turkey's conflict with the PKK on the Syrian Civil War and Iraqi Kurdistan.

In February 2017, the think tank produced an estimate on the Islamic State's financial fortunes. In the same month, ICSR released a report on the Islamic State's doctrine of information warfare.

In October 2016, ICSR published a report on European jihadists and the crime-terror nexus.

In previous years, reports by the ICSR have ranged from the topics such as the narratives of Islamic State defectors, to neo-Nationalist networks.

In addition to reports, the organisation also regularly publishes papers as well as short pieces of analysis, called "ICSR Insights", on their website. Its research fellows often feature as contributors to media pieces.

Governance
The Founding Director of ICSR is Prof. Peter R. Neumann; the Director is Dr. Shiraz Maher.

The organisation's governance structure includes a board of trustees. Current members of the board include:
 Rt. Hon. Kim Campbell
 Prof. Lawrence Freedman
 Jeremy Sacher
 Henry Sweetbaum (Chairman)
 Azeem Ibrahim
 Jonathan Sieff
Further, ICSR is affiliated with TRENDS Research and Advisory, the Pakistan Institute for Peace Studies in Islamabad, and the Centre for Policy Research, New Delhi.

Controversies 
 Netherlands'  newspaper NRC Handelsblad on 19 November 2014 interviewed Shiraz Maher, then 'coordinator of the research' of the organisation, about his insights on European jihadists joining Islamic State in Syria, their motives, etc. Maher advocates to give those jihadists who after several months decide to return home to Europe, a fair chance: "Of course, some of those people are truly evil--those you must arrest the second they step out of the plane." But "not everyone going to Syria is a terrorist". "You must give those who want to step out of it, a chance to do so, otherwise they'll remain jihadist the rest of their lives".
 The organisation has been accused of inaccuracy in its April 2014 report '#Greenbirds: Measuring Importance and Influence in Syrian Foreign Fighter Networks'. The report claimed that one of the subjects studied in the report was based in the West, whereas he denied this via his Twitter page and clarified that he had not been based in the West at all since the study was said to have begun.
 Blogger David Cronin, writing in August 2013 on Electronic Intifada, an online publication that is "aimed at combating the pro-Israeli, pro-American spin" in mainstream media accused the organization's then director, John Bew, of refusing to reveal ICSR's funding when he questioned him about it. In summer 2014, the ICSR disclosed that it had obtained funds from the European Union Framework Programme 7 (FP7)-funded academic research network.

Notes

External links
 
 Home Secretary Jacqui Smith gave her first speech on terrorism at the ICSR conference in Jan. 2008
 Government targets extremist websites by Hélène Mulholland
 We can and must control extremism on the web by John Ozimek
 The dimensions of terrorism by Anthony Barnett, founder of openDemocracy

Think tanks based in the United Kingdom
2008 establishments in the United Kingdom
Think tanks established in 2008
Radicalization